Luigi Ferrando (28 April 1911 – 7 February 2003) was an Italian racing cyclist. He was the first non-Spanish rider to win the Trofeo Masferrer, in 1935.

Biography 

Born in 1911, Ferrando began to run as young boy in the 1920s. He participated in several editions of Milan–San Remo and, in 1935, he won the Masferrer Trophy in Catalonia.

Also in the 1930s, won several tours of the Apennines and Italian cyclocross championships.

Palmarès 

 1930: 2° on Tre Valli Varesine
 1932: 1º on Italian National Cyclo-cross Championships
 1935: 1º on Italian National Cyclo-cross Championships
 1935: Champion on Trofeu Masferrer
 1936: 1º on Italian National Cyclo-cross Championships
 1938: 1º on Italian National Cyclo-cross Championships
 1938: Champion on Giro dell'Appennino
 1939: 1º on Italian National Cyclo-cross Championships

References

External links
 « Luigi Ferrando », on le site du cyclisme

1911 births
2003 deaths
Italian male cyclists
Cyclists from Liguria
Cyclo-cross cyclists